Ecuador competed at the 2012 Summer Olympics in London, from 27 July to 12 August 2012. This was the nation's twelfth consecutive appearance at the Olympics.  It had first competed at the 1924 Summer Olympics in Paris.

Comité Olímpico Ecuatoriano sent the nation's largest delegation ever to the Games. A total of 36 athletes, 23 men and 13 women, competed in 11 sports; there was only a single competitor in sprint canoeing, equestrian, judo, and shooting. Five Ecuadorian athletes had competed in Beijing, including weightlifter Alexandra Escobar, who was at her third Olympic Games in London. Argentina-born sprint kayaker César de Cesare became the nation's first male flag bearer at the opening ceremony since 1996. Ecuador also made its Olympic debut in women's triathlon.

Ecuador failed to win an Olympic medal for the first time since 2004. Sprinter Álex Quiñónez qualified successfully for the final rounds in the men's 200 metres, but missed out of the nation's first medal in London.

Athletics

Ecuadorian athletes have so far achieved qualifying standards in the following athletics events (up to a maximum of 3 athletes in each event at the 'A' Standard, and 1 at the 'B' Standard):

Key
 Note – Ranks given for track events are within the athlete's heat only
 Q = Qualified for the next round
 q = Qualified for the next round as a fastest loser or, in field events, by position without achieving the qualifying target
 NR = National record
 N/A = Round not applicable for the event
 Bye = Athlete not required to compete in round

Men
Track & road events

Field events

Women
Track & road events

Boxing

Ecuador has qualified boxers for the following events

Men

Canoeing

Sprint
Ecuador has qualified boats for the following events

Qualification Legend: FA = Qualify to final (medal); FB = Qualify to final B (non-medal)

Cycling

Road

BMX

Equestrian

Eventing

Judo

Ecuador has qualified 1 judoka

Shooting

Women

Swimming

Men

Women

Triathlon

Ecuador has qualified the following athletes.

Weightlifting

Ecuador has qualified 1 man and 3 women.

Wrestling

Ecuador has qualified in the following events.

Key:
  – Victory by Fall.
  – Decision by Points – the loser with technical points.
  – Decision by Points – the loser without technical points.

Men's Greco-Roman

Women's freestyle

See also
Ecuador at the 2011 Pan American Games

References

External links

Nations at the 2012 Summer Olympics
2012
2012 in Ecuadorian sport